Originally released in 1994, Just Say Roe was the seventh and final in the Just Say Yes series from Sire Records.  It contained primarily non-album tracks of artists on the label, most of which were alternative rock, but also included some pop and dance. It was conceived specifically as a pro-choice album, put together by Sire after a letter from a listener named Todd VerBeek suggested the title and praised Sire for their willingness to address other politically sensitive issues (including freedom of expression, voter registration, and AIDS education).

Track listing
David Byrne - "Lilies of the Valley"
Madonna - "Goodbye to Innocence"
Doubleplusgood - "The Winding Song"
Waterlillies (duo) - "I Am Woman"
Belly - "It's Not Unusual"
The Farm - "Comfort"
John Wesley Harding - "Right to Choose"
Kristin Hersh - "Hysterical Bending"
Scorpio Rising - "It's Obvious"
Poster Children - "Roe v. Wade"
Danielle Dax - "Defiled"
Tripmaster Monkey - "Blatant Affair"
Bigod 20 - "It's Up to You"
Judybats - "What We Lose"
Ride - "I Don't Want to Be a Soldier"
Greenberry Woods - "Adieu"

Adapted from Amazon listing.

It is volume seven in the Just Say Yes series of promotional compilations, of which each title was a variation on the 'Just Say' theme:

 Just Say Yes Volume I: Just Say Yes (1987)
 Just Say Yes Volume II: Just Say Yo (1988)
 Just Say Yes Volume III: Just Say Mao (1989)
 Just Say Yes Volume IV: Just Say Da (1990)
 Just Say Yes Volume V: Just Say Anything (1991)
 Just Say Yes Volume VI: Just Say Yesterday (1992)

References

1994 compilation albums
Alternative rock compilation albums
Sire Records compilation albums
Various artists albums